The Superions are an American comedy synthpop band formed in Orlando, Florida in 2006 as a side project of The B-52s frontman Fred Schneider with Noah Brodie and Dan Marshall.

History

Formation and early years (2006–2008) 
The band, originally named The Del Morons, was founded in 2006 by Fred Schneider and friends Noah Brodie and Dan Marshall. Schneider first met Brodie and Marshall, vinyl nuts like him, in 2002 through a mutual friend who has a record store in Orlando, Florida. Eventually, whenever in Orlando, Schneider began staying with Brodie and Marshall at their home and turned them on to lounge and tiki music.

During a stay in December 2006, Brodie and Marshall played Schneider a track they had composed using Pro Tools and asked Schneider if he would put words to it. Schneider came up with the lyrics for "Totally Nude Island" off the top of his head and, because of Brodie and Marshall's noisy pet azure lovebird, Mr. Bird, recorded the vocals in the bathroom in two takes. It started out as Schneider, Brodie and Marshall just having a good time, but friends who heard the song suggested they put it out.

"Totally Nude Island", "Who Threw That Ham At Me" and The Superions EP (2008-2010) 
A friend of Schneider's said, "No one's going to take you seriously if you call yourselves The Del Morons", so the trio changed their name to The Superions and released "Totally Nude Island" themselves as a digital single on iTunes on October 31, 2008. The Superions then asked Ursula 1000 to do a remix of "Totally Nude Island" and released "Totally Nude Island (Ursula 1000 Remix)" as a digital single on iTunes on December 18, 2008.

The reaction was such that Schneider spoke to Mike Turner, founder of the Athens, Georgia independent label Happy Happy Birthday To Me Records, about putting out a limited edition vinyl single. A deal was hatched and it was decided to do a full EP release with the addition of two reworked songs from The Del Morons period, "Those Sexy Saucer Gals" and "Who Threw That Ham At Me", and remixes by The Lolligags, Casper & The Cookies and Marshmallow Coast. "Who Threw That Ham At Me" was released as a digital single on iTunes on November 24, 2009 and The Superions EP was released as a digital download on January 19, 2010. The Superions EP was released on CD and Limited Edition 12" on HHBTM Records in the US on February 23, 2010.

In April 2010, Brodie and Marshall completed work on a remix of rapper Shunda K's single, "I'm Da Best".

From April–June 2010, The Superions held a remix contest for their song "Those Sexy Saucer Gals", the Swedish band WeHaveLove was chosen as the winner and "Those Sexy Saucer Gals (WeHaveLove Remix)" was released as a digital single on iTunes on August 24, 2010 and the video by Tom Yaz was released on YouTube on August 27, 2010. The remix was later released on the digital "Bonus Track Version" of The Superions EP.

"Fruitcake" and Destination... Christmas! (2010–2011) 
The Superions began recording new material for a full-length album in January 2010, but during a 9-day session in May, they switched gears to focus on a full-length Christmas album, Destination... Christmas!.  They put the finishing touches on Destination... Christmas! during another recording session in June and completed mixing in July. The Superions signed with New York-based record label Fanatic Records distributed by EMI/Caroline Distribution for the release of Destination... Christmas!.  Schneider says the 11 original tracks "cover all the Christmas themes: yetis, avalanches, fruitcake. It's not traditional."  The digital single "Fruitcake" was released on iTunes on September 21, 2010 followed by the release of Destination... Christmas! on October 25, 2010 on CD, LP and as a digital download. Destination... Christmas! debuted at #13 on the Billboard Comedy Albums Chart on December 18, 2010.  "Fruitcake (Yacht Remix)" was released on December 20, 2010 as a free download on Yacht's website.  In February 2011 The Superions continued working on songs for a proper full-length album during a week-long recording session, they then resumed recording in May 2011.

"Batbaby" and Batbaby EP (2011) 

"Batbaby", a song which was recorded in May 2010, was planned as the group's next single for Halloween.  The Batbaby EP, released September 13, 2011 on iTunes, also features remixes by DJ Beekeeni, DJ Butterface, Phylr and Umpff.  In an interview with Atlanta magazine, Schneider attempted to explain his lyrical inspiration:  "Oh, I don't know.  Some songwriters come up with incredibly smart commercial things and I come up with "Batbaby."

The music video for "Batbaby" pays homage to B-movies, and was filmed on the birthday of Ed Wood.

"Konnichiwa" and The Vertical Mind (2014–present) 

"Konnichiwa" was released to iTunes Stores as a digital download on May 12, 2014 and was the first single to be released from the album The Vertical Mind. The Vertical Mind was released June 23, 2017 on Happy Happy Birthday to Me Records. Tracks (vinyl pressing): The Vertical Mind, Konnichiwa, Glitter Gulch, Albóndigas (Meatballs Olé!), Sleeping Booty, Stampede at the Petting Zoo, When the Dingoes Ate the Babies, Passport Wallet Cellphone, Strip Search, Kiss Me To Heaven, (Underpants) In the Rain, Savage Kiss.

Members 
 Fred Schneider – vocals
 Noah Brodie – keyboards, electronic drums and guitar
 Dan Marshall – programming and keyboards

Discography

Albums 
 Destination... Christmas! (2010)
 The Vertical Mind (2017)

EPs 
 The Superions (2010)
 Batbaby (2011)

Singles 
 "Totally Nude Island" (2008)
 "Totally Nude Island (Ursula 1000 Remix)" (2008)
 "Who Threw That Ham At Me" (2009)
 "Those Sexy Saucer Gals (WeHaveLove Remix)" (2010)
 "Fruitcake" (2010)
 "Batbaby" (2011)
 "Konnichiwa" (2014)
 "Glitter Gulch" (2018)

Remixes 
 Shunda K "I'm Da Best (The Superions Remix)" (2010)

References

External links 
thesuperions.com

Electronic music groups from Florida
American comedy musical groups
American synth-pop groups